Arild Andersen (born 27 October 1945) is a Norwegian jazz musician bassist, known as the most famous Norwegian bass player in the international jazz scene.

Career 
Andersen was born at Strømmen, Norway. He started his musical career as jazz guitarist in the Riverside Swing Group in Lillestrøm (1961–63), started playing double bass in 1964, and soon became part of the core jazz bands in Oslo. He was a member of Roy Hellvin Trio, was in the backing band at Kongsberg Jazz Festival in 1967 and 1968, was elected Best Bassist by Jazznytt in 1967, and started as bass player in the Jan Garbarek Quartet (1967–1973), including Terje Rypdal and Jon Christensen. After completing his technical education in 1968, he became a professional musician and collaborated with Karin Krog, George Russell, and Don Cherry (Berlin 1968), and with visiting American musicians Phil Woods, Dexter Gordon, Bill Frisell, Hampton Hawes, Johnny Griffin, Sonny Rollins, Sheila Jordan, and Chick Corea. During the same period he worked with Ferenc Snétberger and Tomasz Stańko.

In the early 1970s, Andersen collaborated with Norwegian musicians Magni Wentzel, Jon Eberson, Ketil Bjørnstad, and Terje Rypdal, before leaving for an eventful visit to the U.S. in the winter of 1973–1974, and has since 1974 led his own bands, at first a quartet (1974–79). He worked with the Radka Toneff Quintet (1975–81) and has recorded more than a dozen albums as band leader for ECM Records, founded the critically acclaimed band Masqualero, and appeared as side man on a series of recordings. In January 2009, he was named "Musicien Europeen 2008" by the French Academie du Jazz, In 2010, Andersen received the Ella Award at the Oslo Jazzfestival.

In 2022, he recorded a trio album with the American drummer Bob Moses and Slovenian guitarist Samo Salamon entitled Pure and Simple.

Reception
In a review, All About Jazz critic John Kelman said, "Live at Belleville is Andersen's most exciting release to date. Even more, balanced with its lyrical and, at times, near-orchestral tendencies, it's the best disc of Andersen's long and varied career."

Honors
1969: Buddyprisen
1975: "Bassist of the Year" voted by the European Jazz Federation
1983: Spellemannprisen for Masqualero, within the band "Masqualero"
1984: Gammleng Award in the class Jazz
1986: Spellemannprisen for Bande a Part, within the band "Masqualero"
1991: Spellemannprisen for Re-Enter, within the band "Masqualero"
2008: "Musicien Europeen 2008" by the French "Academie du Jazz"
2010: "Ella Award" at the Oslo Jazzfestival

Discography

As leader/co-leader 
 1975: Clouds in My Head (ECM)
 1977: Shimri (ECM)
 1978: Sheila (SteepleChase) with Sheila Jordan
 1978: Green Shading into Blue (ECM)
 1981: Lifelines (ECM)
 1981: Molde Concert (ECM), with John Taylor, Bill Frisell & Alphonse Mouzon
 1990: Sagn (Kirkelig Kulturverksted), commissioned work for Vossajazz 1990
 1991: Secret Obsession (Nabel) with Uli Beckerhoff, John Abercrombie, John Marshall
 1993: Arv (Kirkelig Kulturverksted)
 1994: If You Look Far Enough (ECM), with Ralph Towner & Nana Vasconcelos
 1995: Kristin Lavransdatter (Kirkelig Kulturverksted)
 1997: Hyperborean (ECM)
 1998: Sommerbrisen (Kirkelig Kulturverksted), with Frode Alnæs & Stian Carstensen
 2003: Julegløggen (Kirkelig Kulturverksted), with Frode Alnæs & Stian Carstensen
 2004: The Triangle (ECM), with Vassilis Tsabropoulos & John Marshall
 2005: Electra (ECM)
 2006: Høstsløv (Kirkelig Kulturverksted), with Frode Alnæs & Stian Carstensen
 2008: Live at Belleville (ECM), with Paolo Vinaccia & Tommy Smith
 2012: Celebration (ECM), with the Scottish National Jazz Orchestra
 2014: Mira (ECM), with Paolo Vinaccia & Tommy Smith
 2016: The Rose Window (Deutsche Media Productions),  with Helge Lien and Gard Nilssen live at Theater Gütersloh
 2018: In House Science (ECM), with Paolo Vinaccia & Tommy Smith
 2022: Across Mountains (O-tone Music), with Markus Stockhausen & Vangelis Katsoulis

As sideman 
With Don Cherry
 1968: Eternal Rhythm (MPS)

With Terje Rypdal
 1971: Terje Rypdal (ECM)

With Bobo Stenson
 1971: Underwear (ECM)

With Jan Garbarek
 1969: Esoteric Circle (Flying Dutchman)
 1970: Afric Pepperbird (ECM)
 1971: Sart (ECM)
 1972: Triptykon (ECM)

With Roswell Rudd
 1974: Flexible Flyer (Arista Freedom)

With George Russell
 1971: The Essence of George Russell (Sonet)
 1982: Trip to Prillarguri (Soul Note)
 1983: Listen to the Silence (Soul Note)

With Pål Thowsen, Jon Christensen & Terje Rypdal
 1977: No Time for Time (Zarepta)

With Sheila Jordan
 1978: Sheila (SteepleChase)

With David Darling 
 1981: Cycles (ECM)

With Bill Frisell
 1982: In Line (ECM)

Within Masqualero
 1983: Masqualero (Odin)
 1986: Bande a Part (ECM)
 1988: Aero (ECM)
 1991: Re-Enter (ECM)

With Vassilis Tsabropoulos
 1999: Achirana (ECM)

With Markus Stockhausen
 2000: Kartā (ECM)
 2002: Joyosa (Enja)
 2008: Electric Treasures (Aktivraum)

With Carsten Dahl
 2002: The Sign (Stunt)
 2003: Moon Water (Stunt)
 2006: Short Fairytales (EmArcy)
 2012: Space Is the Place (Storyville)
 2013: Under the Rainbow (Storyville)

With Ferenc Snétberger & Paolo Vinaccia
 2004: Nomad (Enja)

With Andy Sheppard
 2008: Movements in Colour (ECM)

With Chris Dundas
 2014: Oslo Odyssey (BLM)

With Ketil Bjørnstad
 1973: Åpning (Philips)
 1976: Finnes Du Noensteds Ikveld (Kirkelig Kulturverksted)
 1990: The Shadow (Kirkelig Kulturverksted), feat. Randi Stene, poems by John Donne (1562–1626)
 1990: Odyssey (Kirkelig Kulturverksted)
 2004: Grace (Universal), feat. Anneli Drecker
 2007: Devotions (Universal)
 2013: La Notte (ECM)

With Yelena Eckemoff
 2013: Glass Song (L&H Production)
 2015: Lions (L&H Production)
 2015: Everblue (L&H Production)
 2018: Desert (L&H Production)
 2020: Nocturnal Animals (L&H Production)

With Samo Salamon & Bob Moses
 2022: Pure and Simple (Samo Records)

See also 

 List of jazz bassists

References

External links 

Arild Andersen on ECM Records
Arild Andersen discography at Discogs

1945 births
Living people
Norwegian jazz composers
20th-century Norwegian upright-bassists
21st-century Norwegian upright-bassists
20th-century Norwegian bass guitarists
Norwegian male bass guitarists
21st-century Norwegian bass guitarists
Avant-garde jazz double-bassists
Norwegian jazz upright-bassists
Male double-bassists
Avant-garde jazz musicians
Spellemannprisen winners
Musicians from Lillestrøm
ECM Records artists
Male jazz composers
20th-century Norwegian male musicians
21st-century Norwegian male musicians
Petter Wettre Quartet members
Masqualero members